Salzburger Nockerl (pl., Austro-Bavarian: Soizbuaga Noggal) are a sweet soufflé served as a dessert, a culinary specialty in the Austrian city of Salzburg.

Recipe
The sweet soufflé is made from egg yolk, flour, sugar, and vanilla (or vanilla sugar), mixed into a dough. Next, egg white and granulated sugar are whisked into a meringue until soft peaks form and then mixed into the dough with spatula. Finally, dumplings (Nocken, diminutive: Nockerl, cf. Gnocchi) of the mixture are baked in an oven until lightly brown on the outside (10-12 minutes).

Salzburger Nockerl are always freshly prepared and served warm with powdered sugar, sometimes with a raspberry sauce or any other fruit spread layered on the bottom of the soufflé. Though traditionally a dessert, the dish is filling enough to eat as a main course.

Cultural significance
Although presumably derived from French soufflé dishes, Salzburger Nockerl, like Kaiserschmarrn or Apple strudel, has become an icon of Austrian cuisine. Legend has it that the dish was invented by Salome Alt (1568–1633), the concubine of Prince-Archbishop Wolf Dietrich Raitenau in the early 17th century. In any case, the golden dumplings represent Salzburg's Baroque atmosphere left by the territorial prince, whose life of dissipation came to an end when his archbishopric was challenged by the Bavarian neighbours. They are supposed to represent the hillsides surrounding the city centre: Gaisberg, Mönchsberg and Kapuzinerberg. The dusting of powdered sugar resembles the snow-covered peaks.

Fred Raymond (1900–1954) composed in 1938 an operetta called Saison in Salzburg - Salzburger Nockerln (Season in Salzburg - Salzburger Nockerln). In this composition the sweet dumplings are praised as “Süß wie die Liebe und zart wie ein Kuss” (meaning Sweet as love and tender as a kiss in German).

The character David Slater reminisces about the dish cooked by his ex-wife in the 1953 film Die Jungfrau auf dem Dach.

References

 Nicole Stich, Delicious Days (2008)

External links
Salzburger Nockerln, entry in the traditional food register of the Austrian Federal Ministry of Agriculture, Forestry, Environment and Water Management
7 eggs and a lot of air - Salzburger Nockerl

Bavarian cuisine
Austrian desserts
Custard desserts
Egg dishes
Meringue desserts